The 2010 Denver Broncos season was the franchise's 41st season in the National Football League (NFL), the 51st overall and the 10th playing their home games at INVESCO Field at Mile High. The off-season was marked by the draft selections of Georgia Tech wide receiver Demaryius Thomas and All-American Florida quarterback Tim Tebow, as well as season-ending injuries to All-Pro linebacker Elvis Dumervil and free agent running back LenDale White. The team failed to improve on its 8–8 record from 2009, and set a new franchise record for losses in a single season, with a 4–12 record, which was their worst record in the post-merger era, and worst in a 16-game schedule. In addition, this was the Broncos' fifth-consecutive non-playoff season, which is tied with 2016–2020 for the second-longest such streak in franchise history, behind 1960–1976. The regular season was marked by a videotaping scandal and the firing of head coach Josh McDaniels.

The Broncos had the league's worst defense in 2010, allowing a league-worst 471 points (29.4 per game) and 6,253 yards.
It would be the only season the Broncos lost 12 games for 12 years.

Coaching changes
 On January 13, longtime offensive coordinator/line coach Rick Dennison was hired as the new offensive coordinator for the Houston Texans.
 On January 14, longtime running backs coach Bobby Turner was hired to the same position with the Washington Redskins, reuniting him with former Broncos' head coach Mike Shanahan.
 On January 18, the Broncos and defensive coordinator Mike Nolan decided to mutually part ways.
 On January 23, the following changes were made to the Broncos' coaching staff: Eric Studesville was hired as the new running backs coach. Bob Ligashesky was hired as the new tight ends coach, a position previously held by Clancy Barone, who was moved to offensive line coach. Bob Wylie was named the assistant offensive line coach. Ben McDaniels, younger brother of former head coach Josh McDaniels, became the quarterbacks coach, while Mike McCoy, who previously served as both quarterbacks coach and offensive coordinator, retained his position as offensive coordinator.
 On January 28, Don Martindale was promoted from linebackers coach to the defensive coordinator position that was previously vacated by Mike Nolan.
 On February 11, Craig Aukerman, who was previously a linebackers coach at Kent State University, was named the team's defensive assistant.
 On February 23, the coaching staff was finalized, when Brian Callahan was hired as a coaching assistant.

Firing of Josh McDaniels
On December 6, head coach Josh McDaniels was fired, one day after the team's 10–6 loss to the Kansas City Chiefs in Week 13. In addition to the team's sluggish performance (they had gone 5–17 since a 6–0 start to the 2009 season), the videotaping scandal was a factor in his ouster. According to The Denver Post, while Broncos' owner Pat Bowlen did not consider the incident something that merited firing McDaniels for cause, he and others in the Broncos' front office still felt his failure to report the incident was "unforgivable." Running backs coach Eric Studesville was named interim coach that same day.

Roster changes

Free agents

Signings

Departures

Trades
 March 14: The Broncos traded fullback Peyton Hillis, a 2011 sixth-round draft selection and a 2012 conditional draft selection to the Cleveland Browns in exchange for quarterback Brady Quinn.
 April 14: Wide receiver Brandon Marshall was traded to the Miami Dolphins in exchange for a 2010 second-round draft selection (later traded to the Baltimore Ravens – see draft section below) and a possible 2011 second-round draft selection.
 April 19: The Broncos were involved in a three-team trade with the Detroit Lions and Philadelphia Eagles, with the team sending tight end Tony Scheffler to the Lions – see draft section below.
 July 30: Running back J. J. Arrington, who was signed to a contract in March after spending the entire 2009 season on the Injured Reserve, was traded to the Philadelphia Eagles for linebacker Joe Mays. However, since Arrington was released by the Eagles prior to the start of the season, the Eagles received the Broncos' sixth-round selection in the 2012 NFL draft.
 September 5: Cornerback Alphonso Smith was traded to the Detroit Lions in exchange for tight end Dan Gronkowski
 September 14: The Broncos acquired running back Laurence Maroney and a 2011 sixth-round draft selection from the New England Patriots in exchange for a 2011 fourth-round draft selection.

Draft

Draft trades

Undrafted free agents
All undrafted free agents were signed on April 26, unless noted otherwise.

Injuries
 August 4: Shortly after the start of training camp, the Broncos suffered a devastating blow to their defense, when outside linebacker/defensive end Elvis Dumervil suffered a torn pectoral muscle in practice. Though there was speculation that Dumervil would be able to return as early as November, he was placed on injured reserve on September 4, and missed the entire 2010 season.
 September 2: During the team's last preseason game at the Minnesota Vikings, running back LenDale White suffered a ruptured Achilles tendon, and missed the 2010 season. White, a Denver native, was signed to a free-agent contract on August 4, after he was released by the Seattle Seahawks in May, and spending his first four seasons with the Tennessee Titans.
 September 4: Wide receiver Brandon Stokley was placed on injured reserve. Ten days later (September 14), was released after reaching an injury settlement. Stokley later signed with the Seattle Seahawks on September 28.
 October 18: Wide receiver Matthew Willis was placed on injured reserve, after suffering a broken foot during the team's 24–20 loss to the New York Jets the previous day.
 December 6: Tight end Dan Gronkowski and linebacker Joe Mays were placed on injured reserve. Gronkowski injured his ankle, while Mays sprained a left knee ligament, during the Broncos Week 13 loss to the Kansas City Chiefs the previous day.
 December 22: Fullback Spencer Larsen was placed on injured reserve, due to an ankle injury that he suffered during the Broncos' Week 15 loss to the Oakland Raiders three days earlier.
 December 23: Placekicker Matt Prater was placed on injured reserve. Prater had been bothered by a nagging groin injury for several weeks, and had not played since the team's Week 13 loss to the Kansas City Chiefs.
 December 27: Linebacker Lee Robinson was placed on injured reserve, after suffering a hamstring injury during the Broncos' Week 16 win over the Houston Texans the previous day.

Staff

Final roster

Preseason

Regular season

Schedule

Note: Intra-division opponents are in bold text.

Game summaries

Week 1: at Jacksonville Jaguars

The Broncos began their  season at EverBank Field against the Jacksonville Jaguars.  After a scoreless first quarter, the Broncos trailed late in the second quarter, as Jaguars' quarterback David Garrard completed a 21-yard touchdown pass to tight end Marcedes Lewis. The Broncos answered prior to halftime, as quarterback Kyle Orton found wide receiver Jabar Gaffney on an 8-yard touchdown pass. The Jaguars reclaimed the lead in the third quarter, as Garrard hooked up with Lewis again on a 10-yard touchdown pass. The Broncos responded with a 1-yard touchdown run from running back Knowshon Moreno. However, the Jaguars grabbed the lead again, with a 45-yard field goal by placekicker Josh Scobee. The Broncos caught up in the fourth quarter with a 54-yard field goal by placekicker Matt Prater. However, the Jaguars got the last laugh, as Garrard completed a 24-yard touchdown pass to wide receiver Kassim Osgood.

Week 2: vs. Seattle Seahawks

Hoping to rebound from their season-opening loss to the Jaguars, the Broncos played on home ground for an interconference duel with the Seattle Seahawks. In the first quarter, the Broncos took the early lead, as quarterback Kyle Orton completed a 13-yard touchdown pass to wide receiver Eddie Royal, followed in the second quarter by a 1-yard touchdown run from running back Correll Buckhalter and a 20-yard field goal by placekicker Matt Prater. The Seahawks got on the board in the third quarter, when quarterback Matt Hasselbeck completed an 11-yard touchdown pass to wide receiver Ben Obomanu, but the Broncos replied with a 1-yard touchdown run from running back Knowshon Moreno. The Broncos increased their lead in the fourth quarter, when Orton threw a 21-yard touchdown pass to wide receiver Demaryius Thomas. The Seahawks replied, with Hasselbeck scrambling 20 yards for a touchdown, but the Broncos' lead was too much for Seattle to overcome.

Week 3: vs. Indianapolis Colts

Coming off their win over the Seahawks, the Broncos remained on home ground for an AFC duel with the Indianapolis Colts. In the first quarter, the Broncos trailed early when Colts' placekicker Adam Vinatieri nailed field goals from 38 and 33 yards. This was followed in the second quarter by quarterback Peyton Manning throwing a 5-yard touchdown pass to wide receiver Austin Collie. The Broncos got on the board, with placekicker Matt Prater nailing a 25-yard field goal. In the third quarter, the Broncos cut the lead, when quarterback Kyle Orton completed a 48-yard touchdown pass to wide receiver Brandon Lloyd, but the Colts replied, with Manning throwing a 9-yard touchdown pass to wide receiver Blair White. The Broncos responded, with Prater hitting a 34-yard field goal, but they trailed further in the fourth quarter, when Manning found Collie on a 23-yard touchdown pass, sealing the win for Indianapolis.

Notes

Prior to the game, a moment of silence was held for wide receiver Kenny McKinley, who died on September 20, with the team paying tribute to him by placing a No. 11 decal on their helmets in his honor.

Week 4: at Tennessee Titans

Hoping to rebound from their loss to the Colts, the Broncos traveled to Nashville to face the Tennessee Titans at LP Field. After a scoreless first quarter, the Broncos took the lead in the second quarter, as quarterback Kyle Orton threw a 2-yard touchdown pass to wide receiver Eddie Royal. The Titans responded, with quarterback Vince Young throwing an 8-yard touchdown pass to wide receiver Kenny Britt. The Broncos retook the lead with a 36-yard field goal by placekicker Matt Prater, but The Titans replied, when placekicker Rob Bironas nailed an incredible 55-yard field goal just before halftime. In the third quarter, the Broncos took the lead again, with another 36-yard field goal by Prater, but Titans' wide receiver Marc Mariani returned the ensuing kickoff 98 yards for a touchdown, putting Tennessee ahead 17–13. Tennessee's lead was narrowed, with a 35-yard field goal by Prater, but was increased again with a 46-yard field goal by Bironas. In the fourth quarter, the Broncos pulled ahead, when Orton completed a 6-yard touchdown pass to running back Correll Buckhalter. After the Titans fumbled the ensuing kickoff, the Broncos increased their lead with 28 seconds remaining, with a 36-yard field goal by Prater. The Broncos' defense thwarted the Titans' final desperation drive of the game.

Week 5: at Baltimore Ravens

Coming off their win at Tennessee, the Broncos traveled to M&T Bank Stadium for an AFC duel with the Baltimore Ravens. In the first quarter, the Broncos trailed early, with Ravens' quarterback Joe Flacco scrambling for a 1-yard touchdown, followed in the second quarter by a 1-yard touchdown run by running back Ray Rice, and a 37-yard field goal by placekicker Billy Cundiff. The Broncos got on the board, when quarterback Kyle Orton threw a 42-yard touchdown pass to wide receiver Brandon Lloyd. After a scoreless third quarter, the Broncos fell further behind in the fourth quarter, with another 1-yard touchdown run by Rice. The Broncos replied, with a 38-yard field goal by placekicker Matt Prater, but a 30-yard touchdown run by running back Willis McGahee put the Ravens' up 31–10. The Broncos responded, with Orton finding Lloyd again on a 44-yard touchdown pass, but Baltimore's lead was too much to overcome.

Week 6: vs. New York Jets

Hoping to rebound from their loss at Baltimore, the Broncos donned their alternate orange jerseys and returned home for an AFC duel with the New York Jets. After a scoreless first quarter, the Jets grabbed the lead in the second quarter, as quarterback Mark Sanchez threw a 32-yard touchdown pass to wide receiver Braylon Edwards. The Broncos responded, with quarterback Tim Tebow scrambling for a 5-yard touchdown run. The Broncos grabbed the lead just before halftime, with a 59-yard field goal by placekicker Matt Prater. In the third quarter, the Jets responded, with a 56-yard field goal by placekicker Nick Folk. The Broncos took the lead, when quarterback Kyle Orton threw a 17-yard touchdown pass to wide receiver Demaryius Thomas. The Jets responded midway through the fourth quarter, after running back LaDainian Tomlinson ran for a 20-yard touchdown. The Broncos grabbed the lead again, with a 48-yard field goal by Prater. However, following a pass-interference penalty on Broncos' cornerback Renaldo Hill near the goal line, the Jets pulled ahead, with a Tomlinson 2-yard touchdown run. The Jets' defense thwarted the Broncos' last drive of the game.

Week 7: vs. Oakland Raiders

Hoping to rebound from their heartbreaking loss to the Jets, the Broncos remained on home ground for an AFC West rivalry match against the Oakland Raiders. In the first quarter, the Broncos trailed early, as Raiders' quarterback Jason Campbell completed a 43-yard touchdown pass to tight end Zach Miller. The Raiders scored again, after cornerback Chris Johnson returned an interception by quarterback Kyle Orton 30 yards for a touchdown. This was followed by a 4-yard touchdown run by running back Darren McFadden and a 31-yard field goal by placekicker Sebastian Janikowski. Things got much worse for the Broncos in the second quarter, as Campbell threw a 19-yard touchdown pass to McFadden, followed by a McFadden 4-yard touchdown run that gave Oakland a 38–0 lead midway through the second quarter. The Broncos finally got on the board with Orton finding running back Knowshon Moreno on a 7-yard touchdown pass, followed in the third quarter by a 27-yard touchdown pass from Orton to Moreno. However, the Raiders struck back, with a 1-yard touchdown run by fullback Marcel Reece, followed by a 57-yard touchdown run by McFadden and a 1-yard touchdown run by running back Michael Bush. Both teams were held scoreless in the fourth quarter.

Notes

This was the Broncos' worst defeat since a 55–10 loss to the San Francisco 49ers in Super Bowl XXIV.

Week 8: at San Francisco 49ers
International Series

Following their disastrous home loss to the Raiders, the Broncos flew to London, England, for an International Series contest with the San Francisco 49ers at Wembley Stadium. In the first quarter, the Broncos trailed early, with a 34-yard field goal by 49ers' placekicker Joe Nedney. After a scoreless second quarter, the Broncos grabbed the lead in the third quarter, when quarterback Tim Tebow scrambled for a 1-yard touchdown run, followed in the fourth quarter by a 32-yard field goal by placekicker Matt Prater. However, the Broncos suddenly fell behind, with 49ers' quarterback Troy Smith scrambling for a 1-yard touchdown run, followed by his 28-yard touchdown pass to wide receiver Michael Crabtree, and a 3-yard touchdown run by running back Frank Gore. The Broncos tried to rally when quarterback Kyle Orton threw a 1-yard touchdown pass to wide receiver Brandon Lloyd (with a blocked extra-point attempt), but San Francisco's defense stood their ground.

Notes

Less than a month later, the Broncos were subjected to a videotaping scandal involving the team's director of video operations that occurred during a 49ers' walkthrough practice, one day before the game.

Week 10: vs. Kansas City Chiefs

Coming off their overseas trip to London and subsequent bye week, the Broncos donned their alternate orange jerseys and returned home for an AFC West duel against the Kansas City Chiefs, hoping to snap a 4-game losing streak. In the first quarter, quarterback Kyle Orton, playing on his 28th birthday, threw three touchdown passes: a 17-yarder to running back Knowshon Moreno, a 6-yarder to wide receiver Brandon Lloyd and a 40-yarder to wide receiver Jabar Gaffney. In the second quarter, quarterback Tim Tebow ran for a 1-yard touchdown, followed by linebacker Jason Hunter returning a fumble 75 yards for a touchdown, giving the Broncos a commanding 35–0 lead before the two-minute warning. The Chiefs got on the board, with a 5-yard touchdown run from running back Jamaal Charles, followed by a 40-yard field goal by placekicker Ryan Succop just before halftime. In the third quarter, Tim Tebow threw his first touchdown pass—a 3-yarder to fullback Spencer Larsen, but the Chiefs responded, with quarterback Matt Cassel throwing a 15-yard touchdown pass to wide receiver Dwayne Bowe. In the fourth quarter, Orton threw his fourth touchdown pass of the game—a 15-yarder to Lloyd. The Chiefs responded, with Cassel throwing a pair of touchdown passes—an 11-yarder to wide receiver Chris Chambers, followed by a 22-yarder to Bowe (both with failed two-point conversion attempts), but the outcome had already been decided in the Broncos' favor.

Week 11: at San Diego Chargers

Coming off their dominating win over the Chiefs, the Broncos traveled to Qualcomm Stadium for an AFC West duel with the San Diego Chargers on Monday Night Football. The Broncos delivered the opening strike in the first quarter, with a 4-yard touchdown run from running back Knowshon Moreno. However, the Chargers answered, with quarterback Philip Rivers completing a 6-yard touchdown pass to wide receiver Malcom Floyd. The Chargers took the lead in the second quarter, as fullback Mike Tolbert ran for a 1-yard touchdown, followed by Rivers completing a 40-yard touchdown pass to wide receiver Patrick Crayton. The Chargers added to their lead in the third quarter, as Rivers completed a 57-yard touchdown pass to running back Darren Sproles. In the fourth quarter, the Chargers continued their dominating night, with Rivers completing a 3-yard touchdown pass to fullback Jacob Hester. The Broncos tried to rally, as quarterback Kyle Orton found wide receiver Brandon Lloyd on a 13-yard touchdown pass, but San Diego's lead was too much to overcome.

Week 12: vs. St. Louis Rams

Following their Monday Night debacle in San Diego and subsequent videotaping scandal, the Broncos returned home for an interconference match against the St. Louis Rams. In the first quarter, the Broncos jumped out to a 10–0 lead, with a 4-yard touchdown run from running back Knowshon Moreno, followed by a 49-yard field goal by placekicker Matt Prater. The Rams responded, with quarterback Sam Bradford throwing a 36-yard touchdown pass to tight end Michael Hoomanawanui. In the second quarter, The Broncos took a 13–7 lead, with a 40-yard field goal by Prater. However, the Rams reeled off 26 points, starting off with a pair of touchdown passes from Bradford to tight end Billy Bajema—2 and 26 yards—the latter with a missed extra point, followed by a pair of field goals from placekicker Josh Brown—28 and 37 yards—before halftime. In the third quarter, the Rams continued their offensive onslaught, with a 1-yard touchdown run from running back Kenneth Darby, giving St. Louis a 33–13 lead. In the fourth quarter, the Broncos snapped the Rams' streak of 26 unanswered points, with quarterback Kyle Orton throwing a 41-yard touchdown pass to wide receiver Brandon Lloyd, but the Rams responded with a 26-yard field goal from Brown. Trailing 36–20 with four minutes remaining, the Broncos tried to rally, with Orton throwing two touchdown passes—a 16-yarder to wide receiver Eddie Royal (with a failed two-point conversion attempt), followed by a 5-yarder to Lloyd, but the Broncos' rally attempt was cut short by the Rams' defense.

Notes

With the loss, the Broncos matched their loss total from the previous two seasons.

Week 13: at Kansas City Chiefs

Hoping to break a two-game losing streak, the Broncos traveled to Arrowhead Stadium for an AFC West rivalry rematch against the Kansas City Chiefs. The Broncos trailed in the first quarter, as Chiefs' quarterback Matt Cassel threw a 2-yard touchdown pass to tight end Leonard Pope, the game's only touchdown. The Broncos responded in the second quarter, with placekicker Matt Prater nailing a 25-yard field goal, but the Chiefs countered, with a 47-yard field goal by placekicker Ryan Succop just before halftime. After a scoreless third quarter, the Broncos cut into the lead with a 41-yard field goal by Prater, but Kansas City's defense prevented anything else from happening.

Notes

With the loss, not only were the Broncos officially eliminated from postseason contention, but they also exceeded their loss total from their previous two seasons.

Week 14: at Arizona Cardinals

Hoping to snap a three-game losing streak, the Broncos traveled to the University of Phoenix Stadium for an interconference duel with the Arizona Cardinals, whom the Broncos had never lost to in the teams' previous eight meetings. The Broncos took the early lead in the first quarter, with a 32-yard field goal by placekicker Steven Hauschka. However, the Cardinals responded, as placekicker Jay Feely accounted for 22 unanswered points—a 36-yard field goal in the first quarter, a 48-yard field goal, 5-yard touchdown run off a fake field goal and a 55-yard field goal in the second quarter, a 23-yard field goal in the third quarter, and a 49-yard field goal in the fourth quarter. A 30-yard field goal by Hauschka cut the lead to 22–6, but the Cardinals answered with an 8-yard touchdown run by running back Tim Hightower. The Broncos responded with a 1-yard touchdown run by running back Knowshon Moreno, but the Cardinals pulled away, with Hightower running for a 35-yard touchdown, followed by linebacker Daryl Washington returning an interception 40 yards (and defensive end Darnell Dockett recovering a fumble in the end zone for a touchdown).

Notes

This was the Broncos' first-ever loss to the Cardinals in franchise history. The loss also guaranteed the Broncos a fourth-place in the AFC West at the end of the season.

Week 15: at Oakland Raiders

Hoping to snap a four-game losing streak, the Broncos traveled to the Oakland–Alameda County Coliseum, for an AFC West divisional rematch with the Oakland Raiders. In the first quarter, the Raiders grabbed the early lead, with a 71-yard touchdown run by wide receiver Jacoby Ford. The Broncos responded, when quarterback Tim Tebow, starting in place of an injured Kyle Orton, scrambled for a 40-yard touchdown run. The Broncos grabbed the lead, when Tebow threw a 33-yard touchdown pass to wide receiver Brandon Lloyd, but the Raiders responded, with a 1-yard touchdown run by running back Michael Bush. In the second quarter, the Broncos lead again, with a 46-yard field goal by placekicker Steven Hauschka, but the Raiders tied the game with a 49-yard field goal by placekicker Sebastian Janikowski just before halftime. In the third quarter, the Raiders grabbed the lead, with a 35-yard field goal by Janikowski. The Broncos responded, with a 35-yard field goal by Hauschka. Oakland lead again, with a 47-yard field goal by Janikowski. In the fourth quarter, the Raiders widened their lead, when quarterback Jason Campbell threw a 73-yard touchdown pass to fullback Marcel Reece. The Broncos narrowed the lead, with a 45-yard field goal by Hauschka, but the Raiders pulled away, when linebacker Quentin Groves tackled running back Correll Buckhalter in the end zone for a safety, followed by a 1-yard touchdown by Bush.

Notes

With the loss, the Broncos tied their franchise record for losses in a single season. This also was the Broncos last road loss to a division opponent until Week 6 of the 2016 season.

Week 16: vs. Houston Texans

Hoping to snap a five-game losing streak, the Broncos returned home for a game against the Houston Texans. In the first quarter, the Broncos trailed early, after a 3-yard touchdown run by Texans' running back Arian Foster, followed in the second quarter by a 3-yard touchdown pass from quarterback Matt Schaub to tight end Owen Daniels, and a 34-yard field goal by placekicker Neil Rackers, giving Houston a 17–0 halftime lead. The Broncos got on the board in the third quarter, with a 6-yard touchdown run by running back Correll Buckhalter, but the Texans responded, with a 54-yard field goal by Rackers. The Broncos cut into the Texans' lead, with a 27-yard field goal by placekicker Steven Hauschka, but a 57-yard field goal by Rackers gave Houston a 23–10 lead. In the fourth quarter, the Broncos staged a rally, with a 23-yard touchdown pass from quarterback Tim Tebow to Buckhalter, followed by Tebow scrambling for a 6-yard touchdown run, giving the Broncos a 24–23 lead with three minutes remaining. The Broncos' defense thwarted Houston's final drive.

Week 17: vs. San Diego Chargers

The Broncos' final game of the 2010 season was an AFC West divisional rematch with the San Diego Chargers. The Broncos took the lead in the first quarter, with a 14-yard touchdown pass from quarterback Tim Tebow to wide receiver Brandon Lloyd. However, the Chargers responded in the second quarter, with a 27-yard touchdown run by running back Ryan Mathews, followed by field goals from 42, 45 and 47 yards by placekicker Nate Kaeding. The Chargers added to their lead in the third quarter, with a 12-yard touchdown run by Mathews, followed by a 37-yard field goal by Kaeding. The Broncos narrowed San Diego's lead, with a 6-yard touchdown pass from Tebow to wide receiver Eric Decker, but was increased in the fourth quarter, with a 31-yard touchdown run by Mathews. Trailing 33–14 with 7:55 remaining in the game, the Broncos immediately responded, when kick returner Cassius Vaughn returned the ensuing kickoff 97 yards for a touchdown, followed by a 6-yard touchdown scramble by Tebow with 26 seconds remaining in the fourth quarter. Following Tebow's touchdown run, the Broncos recovered the onside kick, but two desperation hail mary passes by Tebow were unsuccessful, sealing the win for San Diego.

Notes

With the loss, the Broncos set a new franchise record for losses in a single season.

Standings

Division

Conference

Statistics

Team leaders

League rankings

Awards and honors

Other news and notes
 On March 30, longtime placekicker Jason Elam, who spent his first 15 seasons with the Broncos (1993–2007) and his final two seasons with the Atlanta Falcons (2008–2009), signed a one-day contract in order to officially retire as a Bronco.
 On August 6, former Broncos' quarterback Brian Griese, who played with the Broncos from 1998 to 2002, was hired as the team's primary color commentator alongside play-by-play announcer Dave Logan on the team's radio network, 850 KOA (AM).
 On September 20, tragedy struck the Broncos' organization, when wide receiver Kenny McKinley was found dead in his Centennial, Colorado home of an apparent suicide, at the age of 23. The Denver Post later reported in December that McKinley had accumulated a large gambling debt prior to his death. McKinley was the team's 5th-round selection in the 2009 NFL draft.

Videotaping scandal

On November 27, one day before the team's 36–33 loss to the St. Louis Rams, media reports stated that the Broncos had come under investigation from the NFL, following a videotaping incident. The Denver Post reported that Steve Scarnecchia, the team's director of video operations hired by then-head coach Josh McDaniels in 2009, videotaped a San Francisco 49ers' walkthrough practice, prior to the teams' Week 8 International Series game at Wembley Stadium in London, England. Scarnecchia, the son of New England Patriots' former offensive line coach Dante Scarnecchia, worked in the Patriots' (2001–2004) and the New York Jets' (2006–2007) video departments prior to joining the Broncos in 2009. The Denver Post reported he was placed on a leave of absence by the team after the allegation came to light.

The same day, the NFL fined the Broncos and McDaniels $50,000 each, and Scarnecchia was fired as a result of the incident. Scarnecchia told NFL investigators he acted alone and "knew it was wrong" to tape the walkthrough practice, after the rest of the Broncos' staff had left the stadium. Scarnecchia later presented McDaniels with the six-minute video, but McDaniels declined to view it, and it was not shown to any other Broncos staff member, and therefore the NFL determined the Broncos had not gained a competitive advantage from it.

However, the NFL fined McDaniels due to the fact that he did not immediately report the incident to the league office, as required by policy. Team executives learned of the incident on November 8, and informed the NFL on November 16. NFL Security then began its investigation, which included a forensic analysis of the computer from which the recording was later deleted by Scarnecchia. The recording was retained by the league; in the case of the Patriots' prior incident, the league had destroyed all tapes received from the Patriots. The NFL also fined the Broncos, as "clubs are ultimately accountable for the conduct of their employees."

Scarnecchia had previously been cited for his role in the Patriots' videotaping scandal in 2007. The NFL determined that as a repeat offender of the NFL's "integrity of the game" policy, he was subject to a hearing on whether he should be banned from ever working in the NFL again. "A significant number" of Broncos' employees also certified in writing to the league that they were aware of no further incidents, but NFL commissioner Roger Goodell stated that if any more accusations came to light, he would re-open the investigation.

References

External links

 
 The Denver Post – Complete Broncos Coverage
 2010 Season page on Pro Football Reference
 2010 Denver Broncos at ESPN

Denver
Denver Broncos seasons
Denver Broncos